A Soldier's Daughter Never Cries is a semi-autobiographical novel by Kaylie Jones, who was the daughter of James Jones. It describes her childhood in Paris in the 1960s, her struggles adjusting to her parents' adoption of a French boy, Benoit, and the family's later cultural transition when they return to the United States.

This novel was first published in 1990 by Bantam Books. It was most recently reissued in 2003 by Akashic Books.

This novel was also adapted for the screen as A Soldier's Daughter Never Cries by James Ivory in 1998.

Footnotes

1990 American novels
American autobiographical novels
American novels adapted into films
Bantam Books books